Conveyor transport is the broad category of transport modes that includes modes developed from the idea of a conveyor belt.  Examples include:

 Conveyor belt, two or more pulleys, with a continuous loop of material that rotates about them
 Escalator, a moving staircase, for carrying people between floors of a building
 Moving sidewalk, for transporting along a horizontal or inclined surface

See also
Public transport